Drezner may refer to:

 Tomasz Drezner (1560 - 1616), Polish jurist
 Hanna Drezner-Tzakh (born 1947, Tel Aviv), a female Israeli singer
 Daniel W. Drezner (born 1968, Syracuse, New York), scholar of international 
 Erez De Drezner (born 1978, Haifa), an Israeli male model
 Jon Drezner, an American architect and designer
 Jonathan Drezner, an American sports medicine physician

See also 
 Related surnames
 Dresner (Dressner)
 Dresdner

References 

Germanic-language surnames
Jewish surnames
Surnames of German origin